Arife Kadriye Sultan ("wise, smart" and "valuable, strong"; 24 March 1895 – 5 April 1933) was an Ottoman princess, the daughter of Şehzade Ibrahim Tevfik and Fevziye Hanım.

Biography
Arife Kadriye Sultan was born on 24 March 1895 in the Yıldız Palace. Her father was Şehzade Ibrahim Tevfik, son of Şehzade Mehmed Burhaneddin and Mestinaz Hanım, and grandson of Ottoman Sultan Abdülmejid I, and her mother was Fevziye Hanım, an Abkhazian. She was the oldest child of her father and the only child of her mother. Her mother died when she was three years old.

Arife married Fenarizade Mehmed Raşid on 13 December 1914 in the Nişantaşı Palace. On 6 February 1923, she gave birth to Melike Hanımsultan in Istanbul, who was followed by Emire Hanımsultan born on 7 December 1927 in Nice, France.

At the exile of the imperial family in 1924, Kadriye Sultan was sick, and so was allowed to remain in the capital, until she recovered. Hatice Sultan, the daughter of Sultan Murad V also shared mansion with her, which was used a primary school. Following her recovery, she along with her husband and daughters were exiled to Austria, and then to Nice, France. Arife was a pianist, and during the exile, she used to play piano for covering the family's financial troubles. She also composed various compositions for the piano. Her husband also used to sell matches on the streets. Arife befriended a Swiss lady, Rosa Keller, who was in France due to studies, and the two remained closed until her death.

Arife Kadriye died of tuberculosis on 5 April 1933 at the age of thirty eight in Nice, and was buried there. Before her death, Arife requested Rosa that after her death she would marry her husband, so her children won't be deprived of their mother's love, and then respecting her last will, Rosa married Mehmed Raşid. The family then settled in Switzerland.

Issue
By her marriage, Arife Kadriye had two daughters:
 Melike Hanımsultan (Istanbul, 6 February 1923 - 2007). She married Alfred "Freddy" Giraudy (1914-1998). They had a son:
 Pierre Erol Giraudy-Osman (b. 14 December 1949). He married twice:
On 3 January 1980 with Marie Christine Mehouas. They had a son and a daughter:
Julien Cem Giraudy (b. 11 November 1980, Paris)
Magali Melike Giraudy (b. 10 October 1981, France)
On 23 October 1999 with Martine Robert 
 Emire Hanımsultan (Nice, 7 December 1927 - Nice, 23 May 2004). On 17 January 1957 in Nice she married Joseph-René Chauvel. They had two sons and a daughter:
Jean-Mare Vely Chauvel (b. 16 October 1957, Nice). On 21 September 1983 in Nice he married Aline Kowalski. They had two daughters:
Delphine Marie Claire Roxane Chauvel (b. 2 April 1984, Nice)
Coralie Estelle Emire Chauvel (b. 2 May 1988, Nice)
Annick Kadriye Chauvel (b. 4 May 1959, Nice). She married Jean Pierre Ghiringhelli on 28 November 1987. They had two sons: 
Roland Ghiringhelli (b. 6 May 1988, Nicw)
Gaetan Ghiringhelli (b. 13 November 1990, Nice)
Franck Erol Chauvel (b. 21 November 1961, Nice). He had a son: 
Anthony Daniel Giovanni Chauvel (b. 1 March 1998, Nice)

Ancestry

References

Sources

1895 births
1933 deaths
Royalty from Istanbul
20th-century Ottoman princesses